Fencing at the 2021 Islamic Solidarity Games was held in Konya, Turkey from 14 to 17 August 2022 in Selcuk University 19 Mayıs Sport Hall.

The Games were originally scheduled to take place from 20 to 29 August 2021 in Konya, Turkey. In May 2020, the Islamic Solidarity Sports Federation (ISSF), who are responsible for the direction and control of the Islamic Solidarity Games, postponed the games as the 2020 Summer Olympics were postponed to July and August 2021, due to the global COVID-19 pandemic.

Medal table

Medal summary

Men

Women

Participating nations
141 athletes from 18 countries participated:

External links 
Official website
Results

References

2021 Islamic Solidarity Games
2021
Islamic Solidarity Games
International fencing competitions hosted by Turkey